Patrick Allan Morrow,  (born October 18, 1952) is a Canadian photographer and mountain climber. In 1986 he was the first person to climb the Seven Summits in the Carstensz-Version.

Biography 
Morrow climbed Mount Everest, the highest peak of the world, with the "Canadian Mount Everest Expedition 1982". Between 1977 and 1986 he climbed the Seven Summits in the more difficult Carstensz-Version ("Messner list"). He wrote a book about this process, Beyond Everest: Quest for the Seven Summits, in which he argued the veracity of the Carstensz-Version over the Bass List.

Born in Invermere, British Columbia, Morrow was the first person to summit all the seven peaks on the Messner List of Seven Summits while Richard Bass was the first to complete the Bass List. Morrow was the first person to climb all the eight peaks on both lists (Bass and Messner).

Morrow has other high altitude mountaineering achievements, and in 1987, he was made a Member of the Order of Canada . Professionally Morrow was a still photographer until about 2001 when he transitioned to video.

Climbs of Seven Summits 
 Mount McKinley, North America [1977] 
 Aconcagua, South America [1981]
 Mount Everest, Asia [1982]
 Elbrus, Europe [1983] 
 Mount Kilimanjaro, Africa [1983] 
 Mount Kosciuszko, Australia [1983] (Bass list)
 Vinson Massif, Antarctica [1985]
 Puncak Jaya (Carstensz Pyramid), Oceania [1986] (Messner list).

References

Writings
 Patrick Morrow, 1986, Beyond Everest - Quest For the Seven Summits, Camden House, 175 pgs, 125 colour photos, soft cover, .

External links
 Official site
 Patrick Allan Morrow at The Canadian Encyclopedia

1952 births
Living people
Canadian mountain climbers
Canadian photographers
Members of the Order of Canada
Sportspeople from British Columbia
People from the Regional District of East Kootenay
Summiters of the Seven Summits